Andrew Williams (born 1 March 1979) is a former professional Australian rules footballer who played for the West Coast Eagles and Collingwood Football Club in the Australian Football League (AFL).

West Coast Eagles
Williams was recruited to the West Coast Eagles in the 1997 AFL Draft. He was rated in his younger days as a half-forward flanker and winger and initially selected as a long-term prospect. Williams played 5 games in his debut season followed by 22 games, including two finals, in his second season. Williams played a further 57 games for West Coast over the following three seasons, which included playing all 22 games in 2001. Williams played a total of 84 games for the Eagles between 1998 and 2002.

Collingwood
He eventually returned to Victoria in 2003 when he was traded to Collingwood in return for Damien Adkins. Williams had a solid first year for the Magpies, playing 22 games before suffering injury in the Qualifying Final against Brisbane. As a result, he missed selection to Collingwoods Grand Final side but was controversially allowed to play in Williamstown's VFL Grand Final victory, his first game for the Seagulls.

Williamstown
Despite a good first year for Collingwood, Williams remained playing for Williamstown, Collingwoods then VFL affiliate, over the next 2 seasons and managed just 10 more AFL games between 2004 and 2005. He was delisted by Collingwood at the end of the 2005 season, but after his delisting, Williams continued to play for the Seagulls until 2008.

Williams now coaches the Monbulk Football Club in the Outer East Football League.

External links
 Andrew Williams at the Collingwood Football Club website
 
 

1979 births
Living people
West Coast Eagles players
Collingwood Football Club players
Williamstown Football Club players
Australian rules footballers from Victoria (Australia)
Dandenong Stingrays players
West Perth Football Club players
East Perth Football Club players
Claremont Football Club players